The Kumaun Express (15311 / 15312) is a passenger train belonging to Indian Railways - North Eastern Railway zone that used to run between Agra Fort railway station and Kathgodam railway station in India. It used to run seven days in a week. Its average speed was 36 km/hr. Later it used to run in Kasganj Junction railway station & Bareilly City railway station when Bareilly to Lalkuan & Agra Fort to Kasganj was being made Broad Gauge from Metre Gauge railway line.

Schedule
The 15311 Kumaun Express used to leave Agra Fort railway station on seven days in a week at 21:55 hrs IST and reached Kathgodam railway station at 08.25 hrs IST. Total journey time was of 10 hrs and 30 minutes. Later it used to run in Kasganj Junction railway station & Bareilly City railway station when Bareilly to Lalkuan & Agra Fort to Kasganj was being made Broad Gauge from Metre Gauge railway line. Timings were Kasganj Junction railway station departure 09.40 hrs IST & Bareilly City railway station arrival 12.40 hrs. Now it is fully withdrawn from services.

On return, the 15312 Kumaun Express used to leave Kathgodam railway stationon seven days in a week at 18.15 hrs IST and reached Agra Fort railway station at 04.45 hrs IST. Total journey time was of 10 hrs and 30 minutes. Later it used to run in Kasganj Junction railway station & Bareilly City railway station when Bareilly to Lalkuan & Agra Fort to Kasganj was being made Broad Gauge from Metre Gauge railway line. Timings were Bareilly City railway station departure 22.00 hrs IST & Kasganj Junction railway station arrival 01.00 hrs. Now it is fully withdrawn from services.

Important Route and halts
Agra Fort railway station
Achhnera Junction railway station
Mathura Junction railway station
Hathras City railway station
Kasganj Junction railway station
Soron Shukar Kshetra railway station
Ujhani railway station
Budaun railway station
Ramganga railway station
Bareilly Junction railway station
Bareilly City railway station
Izzatnagar railway station
Bhojipura Junction railway station
Baheri railway station
Kichha railway station
Pantnagar railway station
Lalkuan Junction railway station
Haldwani railway station
Kathgodam railway station

References

Express trains in India
North Eastern Railway zone
Named passenger trains of India
Trains from Bareilly